Brusyliv District (raion) (translit. Brusylivs'kyi raion) was a raion (district) in the eastern part of Zhytomyr Oblast of northern Ukraine.
Its administrative center was the urban-type settlement of Brusyliv, and it additionally consisted of 36 villages. The raion was abolished on 18 July 2020 as part of the administrative reform of Ukraine, which reduced the number of raions of Zhytomyr Oblast to four. The area of Brusyliv Raion was merged into Zhytomyr Raion. The last estimate of the raion population was

Settlements
Rural settlements in Brusyliv raion included:

Brief 
It was situated in the south-eastern part of the region. Distance from the district (urban-type Brusyliv) to the regional center - 80 km by highways.

Natural tourist objects 
There are centres of relaxation and recreational resources of reservoirs on the rivers Zdvyzh, Irpen.

Social and historical tourist objects 
There are the settlements of the Kievan Rus, (XI-XII.) in the villages Soloviyivka, Sobolivka, Skochyshche, Mistechko among the archaeological monuments. 
Architecture –memorials- the church of 17th century in v. Ozera, the remains of the castle of Capuchin Order (1787) in Brusyliv; bust of  Taras Shevchenko (1997) in the former district center, a memorial sign on the place estate of church and religious figure I. Ohienko.

Natives of region 

Aron Baron (1891–1937) was an anarcho-syndicalist revolutionary and theorist. Scientific, religious and church figure I. Ogienko; a singer, People's Artist of USSR Y. Chervonyuk, a graphic artist, the  Honored Artist of the USSR A. Lopukhova; an artist, the Honored Artist of the USSR A. Makarenko; director, People's Artist of USSR B. Nord; in this village passed  the young years of ex-mayor of Kyiv, deputy of the Supreme Council of Ukraine Oleksandr Omelchenko (all - Brusilov); a physicist, corresponding member of NAS of Ukraine M. Lysytsia (v. Vysoke), the Doctors of Medical Sciences V. Bondarenko and B . Omelchenko; The Doctor of Historical D. Pohylevych (p. Vodotyi);the  Doctor of Geographical Sciences, corresponding member of the APSU P. Shishchenko (v. Pokryshiv), People's Artist of USSR P. Nyatko-Tabachnykova and the Doctor of Historical Berezovchuk M. (v. Karabchyn), People's Artist of USSR P. Karmelyuk, the doctor of Medicine I. Kaminskyi- Heleta (v. Soloviyivka); the  Honored Artist of the USSR V. Savchenko (v. Yastrebenka).

References

External links

 Verkhovna Rada website - Administrative divisions of Brusyliv raion 
 Find out Brusilov Region @ Ukrainian.Travel {en}

Former raions of Zhytomyr Oblast
1923 establishments in Ukraine
Ukrainian raions abolished during the 2020 administrative reform